Mimene miltias is a butterfly of the family Hesperiidae. It is found in New Guinea.

References

Butterflies described in 1877
Hesperiinae